Dirkou Airport  is an airport serving the isolated Saharan outpost of Dirkou, Niger.
In early 2018 the airport saw extensive expansion during construction of a base for Central Intelligence Agency drone operations.

See also

Transport in Niger
List of airports in Niger

References

External links
 OurAirports - Niger
  Great Circle Mapper - Dirkou
 Dirkou Airport
 Google Earth

Airports in Niger